Two Brothers is a 2004 adventure drama film directed by Jean-Jacques Annaud. Starring Guy Pearce and Freddie Highmore, it tells the story about two Indochinese tiger brothers named Kumal and Sangha, who are separated from their parents as cubs and then reunited a year later as adults to find their way back home. It was distributed by Pathé in Europe.

Plot

In 1920s Cambodia during the French colonial rule, two Indochinese tigers, a male and a female, meet each other and mate after becoming love interests. Months later, the tiger couple have given birth to two male tiger cub brothers.

While the two tiger cubs are playing, one of them (later named Sangha) comes across a young civet. Sangha chases the little civet into its burrow, but the mother appears and chases Sangha up a tree. The other tiger cub (later named Kumal) eventually appears and chases the mother civet back into her burrow. Unfortunately, humans come across them in their temple home and the tigress arrives to protect her cubs. She picks up Sangha and runs off for safety. Kumal attempts to follow, but can't keep up and falls behind. The cubs' father appears, but the men have caught up with them. The father is shot dead by a man named Aidan McRory after mauling porter in defense of his cub.

McRory is an unscrupulous but kind explorer, big-game hunter, author, and treasure hunter. He discovers Kumal and soon befriends him after having shot his father, but McRory is later arrested for stealing sacred statues from the ancient temple while Kumal is kept by the chief in the Cambodian village where McRory had been staying. The chief then sells Kumal to a circus owned by a cruel circus ringmaster named Zerbino, his wife (expected to have a baby soon), and his faithful sabre swallowing and fire breathing friend, Saladin who becomes Kumal’s nemesis, where he is to be the star attraction soon.

McRory is soon released from prison by the French administrator, Eugene Normandin, due to being a big fan of McRory and all his exploits, but is not permitted to leave the country until all the formalities are completed within the three years sentencing. Nevertheless, McRory is permitted to stay at Eugene's home and is introduced to Eugene's wife, Mathilda who admires McRory and reads all his books as bedtime stories to their young son, Raoul.

Meanwhile, Sangha remains in the jungle with his mother, but both are soon trapped by McRory as game for a vain Khmer prince to hunt. The tigress is shot in the left ear and although she is appearing to be dead, she suddenly jumps up and runs off with a hole in her left ear after being awakened and startled by the flash of a camera. Sangha is then discovered by Raoul and becomes the child's friend. However, Bitzy, Raoul's mother's dog, a schipperke, is a constant nemesis to Sangha.

Kumal remains in a cage of the circus next to the cage of an old former tiger star named Caesar. In order to bring back the skin of the tigress for the prince, McRory makes a deal with Zerbino and Saladin to kill Caesar and skin him, thus, to pass off as the dead skinned tigress itself. Kumal is then replaced as the soon-to-be new star attraction of the circus in Caesar's cage with McRory's condition that the circus people take good care of him. However, the tiger skin trick is foiled when the prince's wife discovers the hole through the wrong ear; much to the prince's disappointment.

Sangha, meanwhile, settles peacefully with Raoul until he is at last cornered by Bitzy. After a prolonged chase, it results in Sangha attacking Bitzy in self-defense. This provokes a hysterical reaction from the household, particularly Raoul's mother (Mathilda), who insists that the cub has now "got a taste of blood" and Sangha is taken away for Raoul's own good. As a result, he is made a part of the prince's palace menagerie, where he quickly gains a reputation as a ferocious animal.

A year later, Kumal, now an adult, is trained by Zerbino to do tricks, such as jumping through a flaming hoop after refusing to obey him and having been "taught a lesson in manners" by Saladin using harsh and cruel methods. Then, the prince decides to hold a festival in which a battle between two great beasts will be the centerpiece. Raoul understands that the prince's tiger is actually Sangha even before recognising him in the cage where the fight is to take place, despite his parents having made him believe that Sangha had been taken to a zoo in Bangkok or Saigon. McRory, however, is not pleased with the idea of Kumal being the opponent for the prince's ferocious animal (not knowing that Kumal is Sangha's brother either) since the circus people didn't keep their promise to take care of him, so he leaves the festival with the village chief's daughter, Naï-Rea, whom he's fallen in love with. Later, when placed in the cage before the audience during the festival, the two tiger brothers do not immediately recognize each other, and Kumal is afraid to fight. However, when they do finally recognize each other after a violent fight, they begin to play with each other like they used to in the past instead of fighting, which amuses the audience. The trainers see this and attempt to antagonize the tigers into fighting; resulting in Saladin hitting Kumal being suddenly attacked by Sangha, biting ferociously on his arm. Zerbino, with a gun in his hand, opens the gate to shoot Sangha; accidentally leaving the gate open. Kumal stops Zerbino from shooting his brother by attacking him as well. The two tiger brothers escape together through the open gate; causing panic among the people in the arena.

After their escape, the two tigers play by causing chaos to people in the area such as: eating food on a bus, bathing in a woman's home, scaring a person next to a News Stand, scaring people crossing a bridge, and eating much meat in a butcher's truck. McRory is determined to hunt the two tigers down. After Kumal shows Sangha how to jump through fire (which McRory and the villagers started in order to scare them and finally have them cornered together to have a perfect shot of them) to escape, McRory and Raoul eventually find them. Raoul asks Sangha to promise him to never return to the villages of men as they will kill down and to stay in the jungle forever, to avoid being hunted. He kisses Sangha and removes the diamond necklace (formerly offered to the prince's wife as a gift) placed on the tiger's neck by the prince when he was in captivity.

McRory watches from the distance and takes aim at Sangha, but Kumal appears behind him: McRory puts down his gun, and Kumal demonstrates that he remembers the honey sweets McRory used to give him when he was only a cub: unfortunately, there aren't anymore sweets left, which makes McRory ask Kumal to forgive him. The tigers then make their way back to their old temple home in the jungle. McRory states that they are taking a big risk, but Raoul justifies that sometimes it's good to take a few risks, which McRory agrees to as well.

Raoul and McRory watch the two tiger brothers leave; hoping they will find another tiger who might teach them how to hunt in the wild. In fact, in the jungle, Sangha and Kumal reunite with their mother, who is recognized by the hole in her left ear. Together, all three tigers find peace resting in the jungle by the stream.

Cast
 Kumal as himself
 Sangha as himself
 Guy Pearce as Aidan McRory
 Freddie Highmore as Raoul Normandin
 Jean-Claude Dreyfus as Administrator Eugene Normandin
 Oanh Nguyen as His Excellency
 Vincent Scarito as Zerbino
 Moussa Maaskri as Saladin
 Maï Anh Le as Naï-Rea
 Philippine Leroy-Beaulieu as Mrs. Mathilda Normandin
Jaran 'See Tao' Petcharoen as The Village Chief
Stéphanie Lagarde as Miss Paulette
Bernard Flavien as His Excellency's Majordomo
Annop Varapanya as Sergent Van Tranh
David Gant as the Auctioneer
Teerawat Mulvilai as Verlaine
Somjin Chimwong as Napoleon
Nozha Khouadra	as Mrs. Zerbino
Sakhorn Pring as Dignitary with Goldfish
Jerry Hoh as the Policeman
Juliet Howland as Auction Room Stylish Woman
Caroline Wildi as Auction Room Companion
Thavirap Tantiwongse as Photographer
Bô Gaultier de Kermoal as Circus Boy
Delphine Kassem as Fleeing Bathing Woman
Alan Fairbairn as Assistant to Auctioneer
Thomas Larget as Residency Butler
Hy Peahu as Dignitaries' Translator
Luong Ham Chao	as Dignitary
Tran Hong as Dignitary
Chea Iem as Dignitary
Ngo Qui Yen as Dignitary
Mathias Ghiap as Residency Cook
Luong Hoan as Residency Servant
Saïd Serrari as Circus Boy
Gerard Tan as Circus Boy
Xavier Castano	as the Butcher
Suban Phusoi as the Bus Driver
Christophe Cheysson as the News Stand Man
 Mother Tiger as herself
 Father Tiger as himself

Production
Around 30 tigers were used for the film, the majority from French zoos and others from Thailand.

Release and reception
Two Brothers opened at No.9 with $6,144,160 in its opening weekend (25–27 June). The film earned a worldwide total of $62,174,008 by the end of its theatrical run against an estimated budget of $42,000,000 making it a box office success. Two Brothers opened in theaters in the United States by Universal Pictures by 25 June 2004. It was released on DVD and VHS on December 21.

The film received generally positive reviews, and holds a 78% rating based on 114 reviews on aggregator Rotten Tomatoes.

References

External links

 
 
 
 

2004 films
Thai-language films
2000s French-language films
Films set in the 1920s
French children's films
Films directed by Jean-Jacques Annaud
Films scored by Stephen Warbeck
Films about brothers
Films about friendship
Films about tigers
Films about hunters
Films set in Cambodia
Films set in jungles
Pathé films
British children's drama films
2000s children's drama films
2004 drama films
2000s English-language films
2000s British films
2000s French films
Films shot in Cambodia